Nicholas Kenneth Robinson (born 9 February 1946) is an Irish author, historian, solicitor and cartoonist who is the husband of the 7th President of Ireland and former United Nations High Commissioner for Human Rights, Mary Robinson.

Background
Robinson was born in Amsterdam, Netherlands, in 1946, to a wealthy middle-class Anglican family. He was born to Howard and Lucy Robinson, the third in a family of four boys. His father was an accountant who founded the City of Dublin Banker and was a prominent freemason of the Grand Lodge of Ireland. The Robinson family had been coopers associated with the brewing business of the Guinness family. Nicholas's grandfather was a coal importer.

While studying for a law degree at Trinity College Dublin, he began a relationship with his future wife Mary Robinson (née Bourke), who would later become the President of Ireland. With his wife Mary, he has one daughter and two sons, and six grandchildren.

Career
Robinson has helped establish numerous bodies, among them the Irish Architectural Archive (with Edward McParland), the Birr Scientific and Heritage Foundation, the Irish Landmark Trust (of which he is a Trustee, ex officio President & Patron), and (with his wife Mary) the Irish Centre for European Law at Trinity College.

Works
His books include:
 Vanishing Country Houses of Ireland with the Knight of Glin and David Griffin
 Edmund Burke: a Life in Caricature (Yale, 1996).

References

Sources
 Olivia O'Leary & Helen Burke, Mary Robinson: The Authorised Biography, Lir/Hodder & Stoughton, 1998

Living people
Alumni of Trinity College Dublin
Irish Anglicans
20th-century Irish historians
Irish solicitors
Irish writers
Spouses of presidents of Ireland
1946 births